Antonia Stergiou (born 7 July 1985 in Sarandë, People's Socialist Republic of Albania) is a Greek female high jumper. She is competing with the athletics club A.O. Kouros Patron, situated in Patras.

She finished seventh at the 2004 World Junior Championships, won the silver medal at the 2007 European U23 Championships and the bronze medal at the 2009 Mediterranean Games in Pescara. She entered the final at the 2010 European Championships in Barcelona, taking the 8th place.

Her personal best jump is 1.97 metres, achieved in June 2008 in Athens.

Honours

References

1985 births
Living people
Greek female high jumpers
Athletes (track and field) at the 2008 Summer Olympics
Athletes (track and field) at the 2012 Summer Olympics
Olympic athletes of Greece
Albanian people of Greek descent
People from Sarandë
Mediterranean Games bronze medalists for Greece
Athletes (track and field) at the 2009 Mediterranean Games
Athletes (track and field) at the 2013 Mediterranean Games
Mediterranean Games medalists in athletics
Competitors at the 2013 Summer Universiade